Mayminsky District (Mayma aymak) is an administrative and municipal district (raion), one of the ten in the Altai Republic, Russia. It is located in the northwest of the republic. Its administrative center is the rural locality (a selo) of Mayma. As of the 2010 Census, the total population of the district was 28,642, with the population of Mayma accounting for 56.5% of that number.

History
The district was established on February 15, 1938.

Administrative and municipal status

Within the framework of administrative divisions, Mayminsky District is one of the ten in the Altai Republic. As a municipal division, the district is incorporated as Mayminsky Municipal District. Both administrative and municipal districts are divided into the same six rural settlements, comprising twenty-five rural localities. The selo of Mayma serves as the administrative center of both the administrative and municipal district.

Economy
The district's economy is agricultural in nature, with developed beekeeping and the cultivation of hops.

References

Notes

Sources

Districts of the Altai Republic